Kamilla Bartone and Oksana Selekhmeteva were the defending champions, having won the previous edition in 2019, however Bartone was no longer eligible to participate in junior events, whilst Selekhmeteva chose not to participate.

Ashlyn Krueger and Robin Montgomery won the title, defeating Reese Brantmeier and Elvina Kalieva in the final, 5–7, 6–3, [10–4].

Seeds
All seeds received a bye into the second round.

Draw

Finals

Top half

Bottom half

References
Main Draw

Girls' Doubles
2021